Precioso Palma was a distinguished novelist and playwright in the Philippines. He wrote the novel Ipaghiganti Mo Ako…! ("Avenge Me…!").  He authored the 1919 zarzuela entitled Paglipas ng Dilim ("After the Darkness").

Filmography

References

Filipino novelists
Filipino dramatists and playwrights